Dr. Gabrielle Jacobs is a fictional character on the New Zealand soap opera Shortland Street and has been portrayed by Virginie Le Brun throughout two stints, the first from 2009 to 2010 and the second from 2011 to 2012. She arrived in February 2009 as a potential love interest for long serving playboy Chris Warner (Michael Galvin).

Upon the character's arrival, she is announced to have Asperger syndrome, a form of Autism, making her the first regular character on the show to be associated with the syndrome. Being hired to replace the murdered Ethan Pierce (Owen Black), Gabrielle clashes with many characters due to her blunt and antisocial behaviour but grows close to womanizer Chris Warner. The two start to date but break up following Chris' treatment of her autism. Gabrielle departed to Italy but returned the following year and admitted she still had feelings for Chris but started to date villainous Shane (Jason Hood). She eventually succumbed to Chris' charms and the two had an affair, before Gabrielle realised Chris' manipulative ways and left New Zealand in April 2012. Her personality has caused her to clash and become friends with several notable characters, including an intense feud with Libby Jeffries (Fleur Saville) and a long running friendship with Sarah Potts (Amanda Billing).

The character's unusual and comedic ways have seen the character become vastly popular amongst fans, winning "Favourite Female Character" at the Throng Shortland Street Fan Awards 2009. The show's coverage of Asperger's has also been acclaimed and praised by autism groups nationwide.

Creation and casting
It was announced in January 2009 that a character with Asperger syndrome would be arriving in March and would "immediately cause some consternation amongst her fellow colleagues." Former What Now host, Virginie Le Brun was announced to have been cast as the over achieving doctor with Aspergers. At the same time as filming her first scene, Le Brun learnt her father had been diagnosed with cancer, making surgery scenes difficult to film. Gabrielle arrived and featured many scenes alongside Chris Warner hinting at a possible relationship. Gabrielle was axed from the show following the expiry of Le Brun's 1-year contract. Both Le Brun and Producer Steven Zanoski agreed that the character had accomplished what she was brought in for and her storylines were over.

In March 2011 after weeks of rumours, it was announced Gabrielle would be returning to Shortland Street after over a year off screen. It was revealed that after Gabrielle's departure, a definite gap was felt and fans requested for her return. Producer Steven Zanoski felt that Gabrielle had to return following Chris' reconciliation with ex-partner, Rachel McKenna, stating; "As stories developed following Gabrielle's departure it became apparent that the character had unfinished business. After all, she is the only woman to have broken Chris Warner's heart." Le Brun was thrilled to be back in the role, stating; "It's been so exciting to be back in the building and playing Gabrielle again. I love the character and it has been lovely to catch-up with the cast and crew. I am looking forward to finding out what the writers have in store for me!" Steven Zanoski later confirmed that one of the reasons Gabrielle was brought back, was so that writers could explore her family, with sister Lana arriving in July. In April 2012 it was announced that Gabrielle would again be departing the soap after her second stint on the show. The character made her last appearance on 26 April 2012. Le Brun found her 2012 exit a lot more satisfying than her 2010 one, stating: "The first time it felt quite scary but this time is different. When I left in 2010, I felt I hadn’t done everything with the character that I wanted to. This time around, I feel like I’ve scratched that itch."

Storylines
Gabrielle arrived after being hired to head the Surgery department following the murder of Ethan Pierce (Owen Black). Her absurd and antisocial behaviour amused yet confused several members of staff including CEO Callum McKay (Peter Mochrie), Chris Warner (Michael Galvin) and annoyed nurse Tania Jeffries (Faye Smythe). Gabrielle started a relationship with Kip Denton (Will Hall), who quickly tired of the lack of emotion in the relationship and dumped her. Gabrielle struggled to operate on an ex-boyfriend but was comforted by Chris, enabling her to carry through the procedure. After running over a cat, an emotional Gabrielle admitted she loved Chris. Chris' partner Libby (Fleur Saville) was appalled and tried to set Gabrielle up with Luke Durville (Gerald Urquhart), who Gabrielle showed no attraction to. Chris soon admitted his love and they started to date, while Gabrielle saved Libby from a dangerous fire.

After being offered a job in Zürich, Gabrielle began to question emotions and when Chris talked down to her, she broke it off with him and left the country. A year later, Gabrielle returned to the hospital and was instantly confronted with feelings towards Chris. She jumped into a relationship with manipulative Shane Tucker (Jason Hood) and later dated Jonathon McKenna (Kieren Hutchison). Gabrielle was fazed by the arrival of estranged sister Lana Jacobs (Brooke Williams), however the two made up. Jonathon left her heartbroken after growing sick of her, sending Gabrielle into a nervous breakdown. Gabrielle admitted her love to Chris and the two succumbed to an affair. However it was short lived and Gabrielle realised she had been used. Gabrielle received a job offer in Sweden and though initially manipulated by Chris to stay, Gabrielle asserted her independence and departed after a farewell hosted by Lana.

Character development

Characterisation
Gabrielle is described as a no-fuss high achiever who knows what she wants and is highly intelligent. Due to her Asperger syndrome, Gabrielle is socially awkward and only gives eye contact if necessary. Though awkward she is confident. Le Brun described Gabrielle having a big heart, saying; "While her response is often quite severe, her intention never is – she's always coming from a good place." She also described Gabrielle's bluntness, saying; "She says things no one else would dream of saying, or they would but three seconds later respond with 'I can't believe I just said that!' But she doesn't realise it's inappropriate." She has also been described as "quirky". Le Brun tried to portray Gabrielle as innocent with her Aspergys, stating; "I do try to be sensitive to it. The really lovely thing about Gabby that I do try to show is that there is no malice in her and she has no agenda. When she says something offensive it doesn't come from a bad place. She's just stating a fact."

Asperger syndrome
By introducing a character with Asperger syndrome, producers sought to break ground, after previously receiving controversy over the character Angus Phelps who suffered from Tourettes Syndrome. Le Brun was happy that a high-profile show such as Shortland Street was giving the condition coverage, stating; "I think it's really positive bringing something like this into the forefront. I had never heard of Asperger's before my audition, and I started researching it because I wanted to make it authentic." The character was said to question the nations social consciousness. Le Brun struggled to portray difficult lines with no emotion, describing them as some of the shows most difficult lines ever spoken. Storylines airing upon her first stint in 2009 saw colleagues bewildered and hesitant at the new doctor, with Kip Denton not handling no emotion in his relationship and quitting their brief liaison. In 2010 Gabrielle began to question feelings and when she was talked down to by partner, Chris, she broke it off with him and left the show. In 2011 upon her return, it is revealed Gabrielle is revealed to be in turmoil over a man dying while fixing one of her surgical machines in Zurich but she is unable to express the emotion she holds inside. Chris begins to suspect Shane Tucker of using Gabrielle's condition to manipulate her into a relationship and Jonathon later dumps Gabrielle after growing sick of her lack of spontaneous behaviour. This causes Gabrielle to become very self-conscious, with Le Brun explaining; "She was pretty crazy about him and she really got her heart broken good and truly for the first time ever. It really knocked her for six and she kind of imploded a little bit and went, 'Oh gosh, I'll never be loveable, no one will ever love me rwally because I'm too weird.' She turns it all inwards and it went quite badly."

Relationship with Chris Warner
The character of Gabrielle was originally written into the show as a potential love interest for long serving character Chris Warner. The two were referred to as "Spock and Kirk" by a writer of the show, referencing the famous Star Trek characters. While Chris was involved with Libby Jeffries, he and Gabrielle started to share a lot of scenes together on screen, with Chris being one of the only characters to accept Gabrielle's aspergers. Chris eventually fell in love with Gabrielle and admitted this at his farewell party in front of Libby. After arriving back in New Zealand he dumps Libby for Gabrielle, though she is at first hesitant, worried she has hurt Libby. The two eventually get together and settle down, with Chris thinking Gabrielle is 'the one'. Producer Steven Zanoski liked the partnership but noted flaws, stating; "Chris has always gone out with glamorous women in the past and now he's found someone who challenges his mind, it helps that she is gorgeous as well. Chris is slowly trying to change Gabrielle, but whether she wants to be changed is another story." Gabrielle soon grows sick of Chris patronizing her and dumps him shortly before leaving the country. Upon her return in April 2011, Gabrielle struggles not to be jealous of Chris moving on with Rachel McKenna and later states she is still in love with Chris. Le Brun enjoyed the pairing of Gabrielle and Chris, stating; "There was a nice dynamic between them because Chris is so used to being the top gun in everything. For once, someone could challenge him to do things he hadn't done before such as playing mental chess. I think it was that sort of thing that put him on the back foot and why he had his heart broken." After he tries to warn Shane Tucker off Gabrielle for her best interests, Gabrielle lashes out at him for prying into her business. In December Gabrielle realizes she is in love with Chris again after she witnesses him dressing as Santa for child cancer patients. Chris admits his love as well and the two start an affair in the Christmas cliffhanger.

Reception
Gabrielle has been seen as highly popular to fans, taking out "Favourite Female Character" at the Throng Shortland Street Fan Awards 2009 and winning runner up in "Favourite New Character" and "Funniest Moment". In 2012, the character was named as one of the standout characters of the show's first 20 years.

Hugh Sundae of The New Zealand Herald praised Gabrielle, saying anything involving the character was bound to be good. Brooke Williams who appeared as Gabrielle's sister Lana Jacobs in July 2011 stated upon arrival that Gabrielle was her favourite character.

As soon as she learnt about her character's condition, Le Brun accepted the heavy scrutiny she was going to receive due to the controversy of the topic. Gabrielle's portrayal of Asperger syndrome was praised, with Jon Boyer of Autism New Zealand stating on her return to the soap in 2011; "Autism New Zealand is thrilled that the character of Gabrielle Jacobs is returning to Shortland Street. The rise in awareness for Autism and Asperger's Syndrome that this character generated was fantastic and we commend Virginie Le Brun for the research she undertook before taking on this challenging role. We would like to congratulate the makers of Shortland Street for presenting Asperger's Syndrome in a fair, balanced yet very entertaining way." Le Brun received positive feedback for her portrayal of Asperger's Syndrome. Mothers of teenagers with the syndrome said their children had taken pride in seeing Gabrielle's character on TV. Le Brun explained the benefits of portraying the role as helping educate viewers about Asperger's, stating; "Kids who have Asperger's have tuned in where they might not have done so before. I think they can find it quite reassuring. We've had the odd email or mums saying they look at it as a bit of an inspiration that while things are difficult, you can do good things with your life." Le Brun met with people from Asperger's organizations and was pleased with the positive reception.

References

Shortland Street characters
Fictional physicians
Television characters introduced in 2009
Fictional characters on the autism spectrum
Fictional surgeons
Female characters in television